Sylvain Girard (born 19 May 1972) is a French former ice hockey forward. He competed in the men's tournament at the 1994 Winter Olympics.

References

External links

1972 births
Living people
Les Aigles de Nice players
Brûleurs de Loups players
Ducs d'Angers players
French ice hockey forwards
Ice hockey players at the 1994 Winter Olympics
Olympic ice hockey players of France
Ours de Villard-de-Lans players
People from Maisons-Alfort
Viry-Châtillon EH players
Sportspeople from Val-de-Marne